The John Cedric Griffiths Teaching Award is presented alternate years to honor outstanding teaching with preference for teaching that involves application of mathematics or informatics to the Earth's nonrenewable natural resources or to sedimentary geology every years by the International Association for Mathematical Geosciences (IAMG). The John Cedric Griffiths Teaching Award, named after John Cedric Griffiths, was established in 1996.

Recipients
The following people are recipients of this award:

1996	John H. Doveton
1998	Margaret Armstrong
2000	Lawrence Drew
2002	Ian Lerche
2004	Jack Schuenemeyer
2006	Paul Switzer
2008 	Vera Pawlowsky-Glahn 
2010	Ana Fernández Militino
2012	Helmut Schaeben
2014	Clayton V. Deutsch
2016   Juan José Egozcue
2018   Ute Mueller
2020    Gang Liu

See also

 List of geology awards
 List of geophysics awards
 List of mathematics awards

References 

Awards of the International Association for Mathematical Geosciences
Awards established in 1996